Herbert Reid Aston (15 May 1885 – 27 January 1968) was an Irish first-class cricketer and rugby union international.

Born at Dublin in May 1885, Aston was educated in the city at Wesley College, before going up to Trinity College to study engineering. While studying at Trinity, he played rugby union for Dublin University Football Club. His performances led to his selection for Ireland in 1908, with him playing two Test matches in the Home Nations Championship against England at Richmond, and Wales at Belfast. He played club cricket for Clontarf, after he was persuaded to join over rivals Pembroke by the club.

After graduating from Trinity with an engineering degree, Aston's work took him to different parts of the British Empire. He worked on reconstruction of the Mandalay Canal in Burma in 1917, and served in the British Indian Army during the First World War as a lieutenant in the cavalry reserve. By the mid-1920s, Aston was an executive engineer with the Burma Public Works Department. He still played cricket when working in Burma, playing two first-class matches against the Marylebone Cricket Club in January 1927 at Rangoon; the first came for Rangoon Gymkhana at the Gymkhana Ground, while the second came for Burma at the BAA Ground. He scored 32 runs in these matches, as well as taking 2 wickets.

He later returned to Ireland, where he took up rugby refereeing and golf. He worked on the River Shannon at Limerick as a river inspector, before resigning in 1936 to move to Dublin to work alongside his brother at his engineering firm, taking over as chairman upon his death. Aston died at Rathcoole in Leinster in January 1968. He was survived by his wife (who died just six weeks later), two daughters and one son. His brother, John Aston, also played first-class cricket. His nephew was a victim of the 1952 Air Lingus crash on Mount Snowdon.

References

External links

1885 births
1968 deaths
Cricketers from Dublin (city)
People educated at Wesley College, Dublin
Alumni of Trinity College Dublin
Irish rugby union players
Dublin University Football Club players
Ireland international rugby union players
Irish engineers
British Indian Army officers
Irish cricketers
Burmese cricket people
Rangoon Gymkhana cricketers
20th-century Irish engineers
Rugby union players from Dublin (city)